Anton Glazunov (born August 25, 1986) is a Russian professional basketball player who currently plays for Krasnye Krylia of the VTB United League.

Honors
CSK VVS Samara
FIBA EuroCup Challenge (1): 2007
BC Ural Yekaterinburg
Russian Basketball Super League (2): 2012, 2013

References

External links
Eurocup profile
Eurobasket.com profile

1986 births
Living people
BC Avtodor Saratov players
BC Samara players
Point guards
Russian men's basketball players